Sri Gowthami Degree and PG College is a pioneering Under graduate and Post Graduate College at Darsi in Prakasam district, Andhra Pradesh, South India. It is the first college among the group of Sri Gowthami Educational Institutions (SGEIs) in Prakasam district, Andhra Pradesh State, established by the educationalist and social activist, Kanumarla Gunda Reddy in the year 2000. It is being managed and run by Sri Gowthami Urban and Rural Integrated Development and Educational Society (SGURID&ES, 412/2000).

A Fleeting Historical Portrayal of SGEIs
Sri Gowthami Educational Institutions are being run under "SGURID & ES". The first institution of SGEIs was started in 2000; "Sri Gowthami Junior College" at Darsi in Prakasam district with few rural villages’ students. Later responding to the civic need, SGURID & ES extended its institutional services to further elaboration of establishing Sri Gowthami Degree College in 2005. Understanding the lack of training colleges or institutions for the teaching and educationalist postulants of Darsi and surrounding Mandals, it started "Sri Gowthami College of Education" in 2006, followed by in the year 2010 started Post Graduate College "Sri Gowthami PG College" and in the succeeding year in 2011, SGEIs started PG Course in Mathematics. In 2012, SGEI it started "Sri Gowthami Junior & Degree College" at Erragondapalem, Prakasam district, AP.  In the year 2013 "Sri Gowthami Degree Colleges" at Santhanuthalapadu and Donakonda and it also upgraded to PG Education in M.Sc. Statistics and M.Com. too and thus it offers all subjects in B. A, B.Com. and B.Sc. and in PG courses in both English and Telugu Medium of instruction. It also runs three ITI colleges at Darsi, Kanigiri and Podili for the technical and professional skill-development of the aspirant youths. The society also provides free education to the poorest of the poor and handicapped children of all castes especially the SC/ST students and participates in social/voluntary services too. Besides the on campus and regular courses, it also take-up distant studies and courses in all UG and PG standards.

Affiliations, Academic and Extra-Academic Status

Sri Gowthami Educational Institutions are affiliated to Acharya Nagarjuna University (ANU), Guntur   and Board of Intermediate Education primarily. And its professional, skill development and technical institutions and colleges are affiliated to National Council for Technical Education (NCTE), Bangalore, APSCHE, Hyderabad, SCERT, DGET (NCVT) Govt. of India and both are also recognized by the respective affiliations of the Government of Andhra Pradesh and Government of India (Board of Intermediate Education etc.)

Besides molding national level standardized and capacitated professionals in rural areas, the SGEIs also creates skilled and nation-building professionals with Social Responsibility and National Integration through its NSS, Voluntary social services, Campaigns, Blood donations, Health Camps, Disaster Relief Supports and all injured from the campus itself. It also conducts Yoga, Meditation, observation of socially important days, participation and conducting of all kinds of sports items in and off-campuses, state/national level competitions too.

Departments

  Department of Botany
  Department of Chemistry
  Department of Commerce
  Department of Computer Science
  Department of Economics
  Department of English
  Department of Geography
  Department of History
  Department of Library Science
  Department of Mathematics
  Department of Microbiology
  Department of Bio-Technology
  Department of Physical Education
  Department of Physics
  Department of Political Science
  Department of Statistics	
  Department of Telugu
  Department of Zoology
  Department of Chemistry
  Department of Teachers’ Training 
  Department of Technical Education

SGEI Colleges and Courses

Infrastructural facilities
Main Campus where there three colleges situated is of a total 4 acres land comprising  about 2, 13,000 Sq.fts. built area, open land and ground with play and sports’ paces for both men and women. There is also a Department of Physical Education which organizes coaching camps and training in major sports and games items.

References

External links
College Website

Colleges in Andhra Pradesh
Universities and colleges in Prakasam district
Educational institutions established in 2000
2000 establishments in Andhra Pradesh